Thecidellinidae is a family of brachiopods belonging to the order Thecideida.

Genera

Genera:
 Bifolium Elliott, 1948
 Bosquetella Smirnova, 1969
 Diraphora Bell, 1941

References

Brachiopods